The House Clodt von Jürgensburg (or Klodt) was a Russian noble family of Baltic German origin, whose members were prominent soldiers and artists.

Notable members 
Karl Clodt von Jürgensburg (Karl-Gustav) (1765–1822) - colonel since 1806, participant in Patriotic War of 1812;
Baron Gustaf Adolf Clodt (1692–1738), son of Johan Adolph Clodt
Baron Johan Adolph Clodt von Jurgensburg
Vladimir Clodt (1803–1882), professor of mathematics and general, chief of drawing department of the General Staff of Russian Army; son of Karl;
Peter Clodt von Jürgensburg (1805–1867), prominent Russian sculptor, son of Karl;
Konstantin Clodt (1807–1879), the first Russian wood engraver, son of Karl;
Mikhail Petrovich Clodt (1835–1914), Russian painter, member of Peredvizhniki; son of Peter;
Mikhail Konstantinovich Clodt (1832–1902); prominent realist painter; son of Konstantin;
Elisabeth Järnefelt (née Clodt von Jürgensburg, 1839–1929); daughter of Konstantin; mother of Arvid, Eero and Armas Järnefelt, and Aino Sibelius;
Nikolay Clodt (1865–1918) painter, grandson of Peter;
Yevgeny Clodt (1866–1934), painter and jeweler, grandson of Konstantin;
Pyotr Mikhailovich Clodt (1903–1942) painter, son of Mikhail Petrovich;

References
 article Klodt von Jürgensburg (artists) on rulex encyclopedia 
 All-Russia genealogical tree

External links
 Genealogisches Handbuch der baltischen Ritterschaften Estland - Genealogy handbook of Baltic nobility

Russian noble families
Baltic nobility